The 1946 Grand National was the 100th renewal of the Grand National horse race that took place at Aintree near Liverpool, England, on 5 April 1946. It was the first true Aintree Grand National since 1940 due to World War II. It was the last Grand National to take place on a Friday, which had been the traditional day for the race since 1876.

The National was won by 25/1 shot Lovely Cottage, ridden by jockey Captain Robert Petre and trained by Tommy Rayson. 

Thirty-four horses ran and one died: Symbole fell at Becher's Brook, incurring a fatal cervical fracture.

Finishing order

Non-finishers

References

 1946
Grand National
Grand National
20th century in Lancashire
April 1946 sports events in the United Kingdom